Mikhail Mikhailovich Bariban (25 February 1949 – 8 August 2016) was a Russian triple jumper who represented the USSR. Bariban trained at Dynamo in Krasnodar. He won two medals at the European Indoor Championships as well as a gold medal at the 1973 Summer Universiade.

 Bariban was the director of the Children and Youth Sport School N2 in Krasnodar.

Achievements

References

1949 births
2016 deaths
Athletes (track and field) at the 1972 Summer Olympics
Dynamo sports society athletes
Olympic athletes of the Soviet Union
Soviet male triple jumpers
Universiade gold medalists in athletics (track and field)
Universiade gold medalists for the Soviet Union
Medalists at the 1973 Summer Universiade